Mian Muhammad Nawaz Sharif (Urdu,; born 25 December 1949) is a Pakistani businessman and politician who has served as the Prime Minister of Pakistan for three non-consecutive terms. He is the longest-serving prime minister of Pakistan, having served a total of more than 9 years across three tenures. Each term has ended in his ousting.

Born into the upper-middle-class Sharif family in Lahore, Nawaz is the son of Muhammad Sharif, the founder of Ittefaq and Sharif groups. He is the elder brother of Shehbaz Sharif, who also became the prime minister of Pakistan in 2022. According to the Election Commission of Pakistan, Nawaz is the one of the wealthiest men in Pakistan, with an estimated net worth of at least . Most of his wealth originates from his businesses in steel construction.

Before entering politics in the mid-1980s, Nawaz studied business at Government College and law at the University of Punjab. In 1981, Nawaz was appointed by President Zia as the minister of finance for the province of Punjab. Backed by a loose coalition of conservatives, Nawaz was elected as the Chief Minister of Punjab in 1985 and re-elected after the end of martial law in 1988. In 1990, Nawaz led the conservative Islamic Democratic Alliance and became the 12th prime minister of Pakistan.

After being ousted in 1993, when President Ghulam Ishaq Khan dissolved the National Assembly, Nawaz served as the leader of the opposition to the government of Benazir Bhutto from 1993 to 1996. He returned to the premiership after the Pakistan Muslim League (N) (PML-N) was elected in 1997, and served until his removal in 1999 by military takeover and was tried in a plane hijacking case which was argued by Barrister Ijaz Husain Batalvi, assisted by Khawaja Sultan senior Advocate, Sher Afghan Asdi and Akhtar Aly Kureshy Advocate. After being imprisoned and later exiled for more than a decade, he returned to politics in 2011 and led his party to victory for the third time in 2013.

In 2017, Nawaz was removed from office by the Supreme Court of Pakistan regarding revelations from the Panama Papers case. In 2018, the Pakistani Supreme Court disqualified Nawaz from holding public office, and he was also sentenced to ten years in prison by an accountability court. , Nawaz is in London for medical treatment on expired bail.

Early life and education

Nawaz was born in Lahore, Punjab, on 25 December 1949. The Sharif family are Kashmiris of Punjab. His father, Muhammad Sharif, was an upper-middle-class businessman and industrialist whose family had emigrated from Anantnag in Kashmir for business. They settled in the village of Jati Umra in Amritsar district, Punjab, at the beginning of the twentieth century. His mother's family came from Pulwama. After the creation of Pakistan in 1947, Nawaz's parents migrated from Amritsar to Lahore. His father followed the teachings of the Ahl-i Hadith. His family owns Ittefaq Group, a multimillion-dollar steel conglomerate, and Sharif Group, a conglomerate with holdings in agriculture, transport and sugar mills. He has two younger brothers: Shehbaz Sharif and the late Abbas Sharif, both politicians by profession.

Nawaz went to Saint Anthony High School. He graduated from the Government College University (GCU) with an art and business degree and then received a law degree from the Law College of Punjab University in Lahore.

Provincial politics

Early political career
Nawaz suffered financial losses when his family's steel business was appropriated under the nationalisation policies of former prime minister Zulfikar Ali Bhutto. Nawaz entered politics as a result, initially focused on regaining control of the steel plants. In 1976, Nawaz joined the Pakistan Muslim League (PML), a conservative front rooted in the Punjab province.

In May 1980, Ghulam Jilani Khan, the recently appointed military governor of Punjab and a former Director-General of the Inter-Services Intelligence (ISI), was seeking new urban leaders; he quickly promoted Nawaz, making him finance minister. In 1981, Nawaz joined the Punjab Advisory Council under Khan.

During the 1980s, Nawaz gained influence as a supporter of General Muhammad Zia-ul-Haq's military government. Zia-ul-Haq agreed to return the steel industry to Nawaz, who convinced the general to denationalise and deregulate industries to improve the economy. Within Punjab, Nawaz privatised government-owned industries and presented development-oriented budgets to the military government. These policies raised financial capital and helped increase the standard of living and purchasing power in the province, which in turn improved law and order and extended Khan's rule. Punjab was the richest province and received more federal funding than the other provinces of Pakistan, contributing to economical inequality.

Nawaz invested his wealth in Saudi Arabia and other oil-rich Arab countries to rebuild his steel empire. According to personal accounts and his time spent with Nawaz, American historian Stephen Philips Cohen states in his 2004 book Idea of Pakistan: "Nawaz Sharif never forgave Bhutto after his steel empire was lost [...] even after [Bhutto's] terrible end, Nawaz publicly refused to forgive the soul of Bhutto or the Pakistan Peoples Party."

Chief Minister of Punjab
In 1985, Khan nominated Nawaz as Chief Minister of Punjab, against the wishes of Prime Minister Muhammad Khan Junejo. With the backing of the army, Nawaz secured a landslide victory in the 1985 elections. Because of his popularity, he received the nickname "Lion of the Punjab". Nawaz built ties with the senior army generals who sponsored his government. He maintained an alliance with General Rahimuddin Khan, Chairman Joint Chiefs of Staff Committee. Nawaz also had close ties with Lieutenant-General (retired) Hamid Gul, the Director-General of ISI.

As chief minister, Nawaz stressed welfare and development activities and the maintenance of law and order. Khan beautified Lahore, extended military infrastructure, and silenced political opposition, while Nawaz expanded economic infrastructure to benefit the army, his own business interests, and the people of Punjab. In 1988, General Zia dismissed the government of Junejo and called for new elections. However, Zia retained Nawaz as the Chief Minister of Punjab, and until his death, continued to support Nawaz.

1988 elections

After General Zia's death in August 1988, his political party – Pakistan Muslim League (Pagara Group) – split into two factions. Nawaz led the Zia-loyalist Fida Group against the Prime Minister's Junejo's Pakistan Muslim League (J). The Fida Group later took on the mantle of the PML while the Junejo Group became known as the JIP. The two parties along with seven other right-wing conservative and religious parties united with encouragement and funding from the ISI to form the Islami Jamhoori Ittehad (IJI). (The IJI received  million from Zia loyalists in the ISI, with a substantial role played by Nawaz's ally Gul.) The alliance was led by Nawaz and Ghulam Mustafa Jatoi and opposed Benazir Bhutto's Pakistan Peoples Party (PPP) in the elections. The IJI gained a majority in Punjab, and Nawaz was re-elected as the chief minister.

In December 1989, Nawaz decided to remain in the provincial Punjab Assembly rather than hold a seat in the National Assembly. In early 1989, the PPP government attempted to unseat Nawaz through a no-confidence motion in the Punjab Assembly, which they lost by a vote of 152 to 106.

First term as prime minister (1990–1993)
The conservatives first came to power in a democratic Pakistan under Nawaz's leadership. Nawaz Sharif became the 12th prime minister of Pakistan on 1 November 1990, succeeding Benazir Bhutto. He also became head of IJI. Sharif had a majority in the assembly and ruled with considerable confidence, having disputes with three successive army chiefs.

Nawaz had campaigned on a conservative platform and vowed to reduce government corruption. Nawaz introduced an economy based on privatisation and economic liberalisation to reverse the nationalisation by Zulfikar Bhutto, notably for banks and industries. He legalised foreign money exchange to be transacted through private money exchangers. His privatisation policies were continued by both Benazir Bhutto in the mid-1990s and Shaukat Aziz in the 2000s. He also improved the nation's infrastructure and spurred the growth of digital telecommunication.

Conservative policies

Nawaz continued the simultaneous Islamization and conservatism of Pakistan society, a policy begun by Zia. Reforms were made to introduce fiscal conservatism, supply-side economics, bioconservatism and religious conservatism in Pakistan.

Nawaz intensified Zia's controversial Islamization policies, and introduced Islamic laws such as the Shariat Ordinance and Bait-ul-Maal (to help poor orphans, widows, etc.) to drive the country on the model of an Islamic welfare state. Moreover, he gave tasks to the Ministry of Religion to prepare reports and recommendations for steps taken toward Islamization. He ensured the establishment of three committees:
 Ittehad-e-bain-ul-Muslemeen
 Nifaz-e-Shariat Committee
 Islamic Welfare Committee

Nawaz extended membership of Economic Cooperation Organization (ECO) to all Central Asian Muslim countries, to unite them into a Muslim Bloc. Nawaz included environmentalism in his government platform, and established the Environmental Protection Agency in 1997.

Conflicts

Following the imposition and passing of Resolution 660, 661, and 665, Nawaz sided with the United Nations on the Iraqi invasion of Kuwait. Nawaz's government criticised Iraq for invading the fellow Muslim country, which strained Pakistan's relationships with Iraq. This continued as Pakistan sought to strengthen its relations with Iran. This policy continued under Benazir Bhutto and Pervez Musharraf until the removal of Saddam Hussein in 2003. Nawaz raised the issue of Kashmir in international forums and worked toward a peaceful transfer of power in Afghanistan to curb the rampant trading of illicit drugs and weapons across the border.

Nawaz challenged former Chief of Army Staff General Mirza Aslam Beg over the 1991 Gulf War. Under the direction of Beg, Pakistan Armed Forces participated in Operation Desert Storm and the Army Special Service Group and the Naval Special Service Group were deployed to Saudi Arabia to provide security for the Saudi royal family.

Nawaz faced difficulty working with the PPP and the Mutahidda Qaumi Movement (MQM), a potent force in Karachi. The MQM and the PPP opposed Nawaz due to his focus on beautifying Punjab and Kashmir while neglecting Sindh, and the MQM also opposed Nawaz's conservatism. Although the MQM had formed the government with Nawaz, the political tensions between liberalism and conservatism erupted into conflict by renegade factions in 1992.

To end the fighting between PML-N and MQM, Nawaz's party passed a resolution to launch a paramilitary operation under command of Chief of Army Staff General Asif Nawaz Janjua. Violence erupted in Karachi in 1992 and brought the economy to a halt. During this time, Benazir Bhutto and the centre-left PPP remained neutral, but her brother Murtaza Bhutto exerted pressure which suspended the operation. The period of 1992–1994 is considered the bloodiest in the history of the city, with many people missing.

Industrialization and privatisation
Nawaz had campaigned on a conservative platform and after assuming office announced his economic policy under the National Economic Reconstruction Programme (NERP). This programme introduced an extreme level of the Western-styled capitalist economics.

Unemployment had limited Pakistan's economic growth and Nawaz believed that only privatisation could solve this problem. Nawaz introduced an economy based on privatisation and economic liberalisation, notably for banks and industries. According to the US Department of State, this followed a vision of "turning Pakistan into a [South] Korea by encouraging greater private saving and investment to accelerate economic growth."

The privatisation programme reversed the nationalisation by Zulfikar Ali Bhutto and the PPP in the 1970s. By 1993, around 115 nationalised industries were opened to private ownership, including the National Development Finance Corporation, Pakistan National Shipping Corporation, National Electric Power Regulatory Authority, Pakistan International Airlines (PIA), Pakistan Telecommunication Corporation, and Pakistan State Oil. This boosted the economy but a lack of competition in bidding allowed the rise of business oligarchs and further widened the wealth gap, contributing to political instability. Former science advisor Dr. Mubashir Hassan called Nawaz's privatisation "unconstitutional". The PPP held that nationalisation policy was given constitutional status by parliament, and that privatisation policies were illegal and had taken place without parliamentary approval.

Nawaz initiated several large-scale projects to stimulate the economy, such as the Ghazi-Barotha Hydropower Project. However, unemployment remained a challenge. In an attempt to counter this, Nawaz imported thousands of privatised Yellow-cab taxis for young Pakistanis, but few of the loans were repaid and Nawaz was forced to pay for them through his steel industry. Nawaz's projects were not evenly distributed, focusing on Punjab and Kashmir Provinces, the base of his support, with lesser efforts in Khyber and Balochistan provinces, and no benefits from industrialization in Sindh Province. After intense criticism from the PPP and MQM, Nawaz completed the Orangi Cottage Industrial Zone but this did not repair his reputation in Sindh. Opponents accused Nawaz of using political influence to build factories for himself and his business, for expanding the Armed Forces' secretive industrial conglomerate and bribing generals.

Science policy

While privatising industry, Nawaz took steps for intense government control of science in Pakistan, and placed projects under his authorisation. In 1991, Nawaz founded and authorised the Pakistan Antarctic Programme under the scientific directions of National Institute of Oceanography (NIO), with the Pakistan Navy's Weapons Engineering Division, and first established the Jinnah Antarctic Station and Polar Research Cell. In 1992, Pakistan became an associate member of the Scientific Committee on Antarctic Research.

On 28 July 1997, Nawaz declared 1997 a year of science in Pakistan and personally allotted funds for the 22nd INSC College on Theoretical Physics. In 1999, Nawaz signed the executive decree, declaring 28 May as the National Science Day in Pakistan.

Nuclear policy
Nawaz made the nuclear weapons and energy programme one of his top priorities. He expanded the nuclear energy program, and continued an atomic programme while following a policy of deliberate nuclear ambiguity.

This resulted in a nuclear crisis with the United States which tightened its embargo on Pakistan in December 1990 and reportedly offered substantial economic aid to halt the country's uranium enrichment programme. Responding to US embargo, Nawaz announced that Pakistan had no atomic bomb, and would sign the Nuclear Nonproliferation Treaty if India did as well. The embargo blocked plans for a French-built nuclear power plant, so Nawaz's advisors intensively lobbied the International Atomic Energy Agency (IAEA), which allowed China to establish CHASNUPP-I nuclear power plant and upgrade KANUPP-I.

Nawaz's nuclear policy was considered less aggressive towards India with its focus on public usage through nuclear power and medicine, viewed as a continuation of the US Atoms for Peace programme. In 1993, Nawaz established the Institute of Nuclear Engineering (INE) to promote his policy for the peaceful use of nuclear energy.

Co-operatives societies scandal
Nawaz suffered a major loss of political support from the co-operatives societies scandal. These societies accept deposits from members and can legally make loans only to members for purposes to the benefit of the membership. However, mismanagement led to a collapse affecting millions of Pakistanis in 1992. In Punjab and Kashmir, around 700,000 people lost their savings, and it was discovered that billions of rupees had been granted to the Ittefaq Group of Industries – Nawaz's steel mill. Although the loans were hurriedly repaid, Nawaz's reputation was severely damaged.

Constitutional crisis and resignation
Nawaz had developed serious issues of authority with conservative President Ghulam Ishaq Khan, who had raised Nawaz to prominence during the Zia dictatorship. On 18 April, ahead of the 1993 Parliamentary election, Khan used his reserve powers (58-2b) to dissolve the National Assembly, and with the support of the army appointed Mir Balakh Sher as interim prime minister. Nawaz refused to accept this act and raised a challenge at the Supreme Court of Pakistan. On 26 May, the Supreme Court ruled 10–1 that the presidential order was unconstitutional, that the president could dissolve the assembly only if a constitutional breakdown had occurred and that the government's incompetence or corruption was irrelevant. (Justice Sajjad Ali Shah was the only dissenting judge; he later became 13th Chief Justice of Pakistan.)

Issues of authority continued. In July 1993, under pressure from the armed forces, Nawaz resigned under an agreement that also removed President Khan from power. Chairman of the Joint Chiefs of Staff Committee General Shamim Allam and the Chief of Army Staff General Abdul Vahied Kakar forced Khan to resign from the presidency and ended the political standoff. Under the close scrutiny of the Pakistan Armed Forces, an interim and transitional government was formed and new parliamentary election was held after three months.

Parliamentary opposition (1993–1996)

Following 1993 elections, the PPP returned to power under Benazir Bhutto. Nawaz offered his full co-operation as Leader of the Opposition but soon the PPP and PML-N held parliament locked in dispute. Bhutto found it difficult to act effectively in the face of opposition from Nawaz, and also faced problems in her political stronghold of Sindh Province from her younger brother Murtaza Bhutto.

Nawaz and Murtaza Bhutto formed the Nawaz-Bhutto axis and worked to undermine Benazir Bhutto's government, tapping an anti-corruption wave in Pakistan. They accused the government of corruption with major state corporations and slowing economic progress. In 1994 and 1995 they made a "train march" from Karachi to Peshawar, making critical speeches to huge crowds. Nawaz organised strikes throughout Pakistan in September and October 1994. The death of Murtaza Bhutto in 1996, which allegedly involved Benazir's spouse, led to demonstrations in Sindh and the government lost control of the province. Benazir Bhutto became widely unpopular across the country and was ousted in October 1996.

Second term as prime minister (1997–1999)

By 1996, continuous large-scale corruption by the government of Benazir Bhutto had deteriorated the country's economy, which was nearing failure. In the 1997 parliamentary elections, Nawaz and the PML-N won an overwhelming victory, with an exclusive mandate from across Pakistan. It was hoped that Nawaz would deliver on promises to provide a stable conservative government and improve overall conditions. Nawaz was sworn as prime minister on 17 February.

Nawaz had formed an alliance with Altaf Hussain of the MQM which fell apart following the assassination of Hakim Said. Nawaz then removed the MQM from parliament and assumed control of Karachi while MQM was forced underground. This led Nawaz to claim an exclusive mandate, and for the first time Nawaz and the PML-N had the control of Sindh, Balochistan, Northwest Frontier, Kashmir and Punjab. With a supermajority, Nawaz's new government amended the constitution to restrict the powers of the president to dismiss governments.  With the passing of the 14th amendment, Nawaz emerged as the most powerful elected prime minister in the country.

Nawaz's popularity peaked in May 1998 after conducting the country's first nuclear weapons tests in response to tests by India. When Western countries suspended foreign aid, Nawaz froze the country's foreign currency reserves and economic conditions worsened. The country became embroiled in conflicts on two borders and Nawaz's long-standing relationships with the military establishment fell apart, so that by mid-1999 few approved of his policies.

Atomic policy
During the 1997 elections, Nawaz promised to follow his policy of nuclear ambiguity while using nuclear energy to stimulate the economy. However, on 7 September, before a state visit to the US, Nawaz acknowledged in a STN News interview that the country had had an atomic bomb since 1978. Nawaz maintained that:

On 1 December, Nawaz told the Daily Jang and The News International that Pakistan would immediately become a party of the Comprehensive Nuclear-Test-Ban Treaty (CTBT) if India signed and ratified it first. Under his leadership, the nuclear program had become a vital part of Pakistan's economic policy.

1998 nuclear crisis

In May 1998, soon after Indian nuclear tests, Nawaz vowed that his country would make a suitable reply. On 14 May, Leader of the Opposition Benazir Bhutto and MQM called for nuclear tests, followed by calls from the public. When India tested its nuclear weapons the second time, it caused a great alarm in Pakistan and pressure mounted on Nawaz. On 15 May, Nawaz put the armed forces on high-alert and called a National Security Council meeting, discussing the financial, diplomatic, military, strategic and national security concerns. Only Treasure Minister Sartaj Aziz opposed the tests, due to the economic recession, low foreign exchange reserves, and economic sanctions.

Nawaz was initially hesitant of the economic impact of nuclear testing,
and observed the international reaction to India's tests, where an embargo had no economic effect. Failure to conduct the tests would put the credibility of Pakistan's nuclear deterrence in doubt, which was emphasized when Indian Home Minister Lal Kishanchand Advani and Defence Minister George Fernandes gloated and belittled Pakistan, angering Nawaz.

On 18 May, Nawaz ordered the Pakistan Atomic Energy Commission (PAEC) to make preparation for the tests, and put military forces on high alert to provide support. On 21 May, Nawaz authorised nuclear weapon tests in Balochistan.

On 27 May, the day before testing, the ISI detected Israeli F-16 fighters conducting exercises and received intelligence that they had orders to attack Pakistan's nuclear facilities on behalf of India. Nawaz scrambled the Pakistan Air Force and had nuclear bombs prepared for deployment. According to political scientist Shafik H. Hashmi, the US and other nations assured Nawaz that Pakistan was safe; the Israeli attack never materialized.

On 28 and 30 May 1998, Pakistan successfully carried out its nuclear tests, codenamed Chagai-I and Chagai-II. Following these test, Nawaz appeared on national television and stated:

Nawaz's political prestige reached its peak when the country went nuclear. Despite the intense international criticism and decline in foreign investment and trade, Nawaz's domestic popularity increased, as the tests made Pakistan the first Muslim country and seventh nation to become a nuclear power. Editorials were full of praise for the country's leadership and advocated the development of nuclear deterrence. Leader of the Opposition Benazir Bhutto congratulated Nawaz for his "bold decision" in spite of the economic outcomes, and felt that the tests erased doubts and fears which troubled the nation since the Indo-Pakistani war of 1971. In India, opposition leaders in parliament blamed the government for starting a nuclear arms race. Nawaz was awarded an Ig Nobel prize for his "aggressively peaceful explosions of atomic bombs".

Economic policy
Nawaz built Pakistan's first major motorway, the M2 Motorway (3MM), called the Autobahn of South Asia. This public-private project was completed in November 1997 at a cost of US$989.12 million. His critics questioned the layout of the highway, its excessive length, its distance from important cities, and the absence of link roads with important towns. It also appropriated funds designated for the Peshawar–Karachi Indus Highway, benefiting Punjab and Kashmir at the cost of other provinces. There was particular dissatisfaction in Sindh and Balochistan Provinces, and Nawaz faced a lack of capital investment to finance additional projects. Nawaz loosened foreign exchange restrictions and opened Karachi Stock Exchange to foreign capital, but the government remained short of funds for investments.

Due to economic pressures, Nawaz halted the national space programme. This forced the Space Research Commission to delay the launch of its satellite, Badr-II(B), which was completed in 1997. This caused frustration among the scientific community who criticised Nawaz's inability to promote science. Senior scientists and engineers attributed this to "Nawaz's personal corruption" that affected national security.

By the end of Nawaz's second term, the economy was in turmoil. The government faced serious structural issues and financial problems; inflation and foreign debt stood at an all-time high, and unemployment in Pakistan had reached its highest point. Pakistan had debts of US$32bn against reserves of little more than $1bn. The International Monetary Fund (IMF) had suspended aid, demanding the country's finances be resolved. Nawaz continued to meddle with the stock exchange markets with devastating effects. By the time he was deposed, the country was heading for financial default.

Foreign policy

Nawaz strengthened Pakistan's relations with the Muslim world and Europe.

In February 1997, Nawaz met with Chinese President Jiang Zemin and Premier Li Peng to discuss economic cooperation. Two conferences were organised in Beijing and Hong Kong to promote Chinese investment in Pakistan.

In 1997, Nawaz signed a trilateral free trade agreement with Malaysia and Singapore, which was followed by collaboration in defence. One of the core issues was Malaysia's agreement on sharing its space technology with Pakistan. Both Malaysia and Singapore assured their support for Pakistan to join Asia–Europe Meeting, though Pakistan and India were not parties to the treaty until 2008.

In January 1998, Nawaz signed bilateral economic agreements with South Korean President Kim Young-sam. Nawaz urged North Korea to make peace and improve its ties with South Korea; causing a division in Pakistan–North Korean relations. In April 1998, Nawaz went on to visit Italy, Germany, Poland, and Belgium to promote economic ties. He signed a number of agreements to enlarge economic co-operation with Italy and Belgium, and an agreement with the European Union (EU) for the protection of intellectual, industrial and commercial property rights.

However, Nawaz's diplomatic efforts seemed to have gone to waste after conducting nuclear tests in May 1998. Widespread international criticism brought Pakistan's reputation to a low since the Indo-Pakistani war of 1971. Pakistan failed to gather any support from its allies at the UN, and trade agreements were repealed by the US, Europe, and Asian bloc. Pakistan was accused of allowing nuclear proliferation. In June 1998, Nawaz authorised a secret meeting between Pakistan and Israel's ambassadors to the UN and US, and assured Israeli Prime Minister Benjamin Netanyahu that Pakistan would not transfer nuclear technology or materials to Iran or other Middle Eastern countries. Israel responded with concerns that Iranian Foreign Minister Kamal Kharrazi's visit to Pakistan shortly after the May 1998 nuclear weapons tests was a sign that Pakistan was preparing to sell nuclear technology to Iran.

In 1998, India and Pakistan made an agreement recognising the principle of building an environment of peace and security and resolving all bilateral conflicts. On 19 February 1999, Indian Premier Atal Bihari Vajpayee paid a historic state visit to Pakistan, travelling on the inaugural Delhi–Lahore Bus connecting the Indian capital with Pakistan's major cultural city of Lahore. On 21 February, the prime ministers signed a bilateral agreement with a memorandum of understanding to ensure nuclear-free safety in South Asia, which became known as the Lahore Declaration. The agreement was widely popular in both countries, where it was felt that development of nuclear weapons brought added responsibility and promoted the importance of confidence-building measures to avoid accidental or unauthorised use of nuclear weapons. Some Western observers compared the treaty to the cold war Strategic Arms Limitation Talks.

Constitutional amendments

In late August 1998, Nawaz proposed a law to establish a legal system based on Islamic principles. His proposal came a week after the 10-year commemorations of the late president Zia ul-Haq. After his cabinet removed some of its controversial aspects, the National Assembly approved and passed the bill on 10 October 1998 by a vote of 151 to 16. With a majority in parliament, Nawaz reverted the semi-presidential system in favour of a more parliamentary system. With these amendments, Nawaz became the country's strongest freely-elected prime minister. However, these amendments failed to achieve a two-thirds majority in the Senate, which remained under the control of the PPP. Weeks later, parliament was suspended by a military coup and Legal Framework Order, 2002 (2002 LFO) returned the country to a semi-presidential system for another decade.

Nawaz's Fourteenth Amendment consolidated his power by preventing legislators and lawmakers from dissenting or voting against their own parties, and prohibited judicial appeal for offenders. Legislators from different parties challenged this with the Supreme Court, infuriating Nawaz. He openly criticised Chief Justice Sajad Alishah, inviting a notice of contempt. At the urging of the military and president, Nawaz agreed the solve the conflict amicably but remained determined to oust Alishah.

1997 Constitutional crisis
Nawaz manipulated the ranks of senior judges, deposing two judges close to Alishah. The deposed judges challenged Nawaz's orders on procedural grounds by filing a petition at Quetta High Court on 26 November 1997. Alishah was restrained by his fellow judges from adjudicating in the case against the prime minister. On 28 November, Nawaz appeared in the Supreme Court and justified his actions, citing evidence against the two deposed judges. Alishah suspended the decision of Quetta High Court, but soon the Peshawar High Court issued similar orders removing Alishah's closest judges. The associate chief justice of Peshawar High Court, Justice Saeeduzzaman Siddiqui, declared himself acting chief justice.

Alishah continued to assert his authority and persisted in hearing Nawaz's case. On 30 November, Nawaz's cabinet ministers and a large number of supporters entered the Supreme Court building, disrupting the proceedings. The chief justice requested the military police, and subsequently struck down the Thirteenth Amendment, restoring the power of the president. However, the military-backed Nawaz refused to obey the president's orders to remove him. Nawaz forced President Farooq Leghari to resign, and appointed Wasim Sajjad as acting president, then ousted Alishah to end the constitutional crisis.

On 29 November 2006, Nawaz and the PML-N issued a formal apology for their actions to Alishah and Leghari. A written apology was presented to Alishah at his residence and later, his party issued a white paper in Parliament formally apologising for their wrongdoing.

Policy on anti-terrorism
Nawaz passed the controversial Anti-Terrorist Act on 17 August 1997, which established Anti-Terrorism Courts. The Supreme Court later rendered the Act unconstitutional. However, Nawaz made amendments and received the permission of the Supreme Court to establish these courts.

Relations with the military
From 1981 until 1999, Nawaz enjoyed extremely cordial relations with the Pakistan Armed Forces, and was the only senior civilian leader to have friendly relations with the military establishment during that period. However, when Chief of Army Staff General Jehangir Karamat advocated for a National Security Council, Nawaz interpreted this as a conspiracy to return the military to an active political role.

In October 1998, three months before the end of his term, Karamat was forced to resign. This was controversial even within Nawaz's cabinet and was seen as the least-popular moment of Nawaz's administration. Military lawyers and civilian law experts saw this as unconstitutional and a violation of military justice code. However, Media Minister Syed Mushahid Hussain felt that Pakistan was "finally becoming a normal democratic society", not beholden to its military.

Nawaz promoted General Pervez Musharraf to replace Karamat, also making Musharraf Chairman of the Joint Chiefs despite his lack of seniority. Admiral Fasih Bokhari resigned as Chief of Naval Staff in protest. Bokhari lodged a protest against the Kargil debacle and called for the court-martial of Musharraf, who Nawaz said acted alone.

In August, India shot down a Pakistan Navy reconnaissance aircraft in the Atlantique Incident, killing 16 naval officers,  the greatest number of combat casualties for the navy since the Indo-Pakistani Naval War of 1971. Nawaz failed to gain foreign support against India for the incident, which newly appointed Chief of Naval Staff Admiral Abdul Aziz Mirza viewed as a lack of support for the navy in wartime. Nawaz further lost the confidence of the Marines for failing to defend the navy at the International Court of Justice (ICJ) in September. Relations with the Air Force likewise deteriorated, when Chief of Air Staff General Parvaiz Mehdi Qureshi accused the prime minister of not consulting the air force in matters critical to national security.

Two months later, after steadily worsening relations with the Armed Forces, Nawaz was deposed by Musharraf and martial law was established throughout the country.

Coup, trial and exile

The simultaneous conflicts in the Kargil war with India and Afghanistan's civil war, along with economical turmoil, turned public opinion against Nawaz and his policies. On 12 October 1999, Nawaz attempted to remove Musharraf for military failures and replace him with General Ziauddin Butt. Nawaz's mindset was to remove the Chairman Joint Chiefs and the Chief of Army Staff first, then depose the other armed forces chiefs who had destroyed his credibility. Musharraf, who was in Sri Lanka, attempted to return on a PIA commercial flight.

Nawaz ordered the Sindh Police Force to arrest Musharraf. Fearing a coup d'état, he further ordered the Jinnah Terminal to be sealed to prevent the landing of the airliner. The A300 aircraft was ordered to land at Nawabshah Airport (now Shaheed Benazirabad Airport). There, Musharraf contacted top Pakistan Army generals who took over the country and ousted Nawaz's administration. Nawaz was taken to Adiala Jail for trial by a military judge. Musharraf later assumed control of the government as chief executive. A single protest was held by Sardar Mohsin Abbasi in front of the Supreme Court on 17 October on the first hearing of Nawaz.

Raja Zafar-ul-Haq, Sir Anjam Khan, Zafer Ali Shah and Sardar Mohsin Abbasi were the only supporters left after the first six months. Many of Nawaz's cabinet ministers and his constituents were divided during the court proceedings and remained neutral. Dissidents such as Chaudhry Shujaat Hussain remained quiet and later formed Pakistan Muslim League (Q) (PML-Q), splitting Nawaz's party into small factions. The military police initiated massive arrests of the PML workers and party leaders, who were held in Sindh and Punjab police prisons.

The military placed Nawaz on trial for "kidnapping, attempted murder, hijacking and terrorism and corruption". In a speedy trial, the military court convicted Nawaz and gave him a life sentence. Reports surfaced that Nawaz had nearly been sentenced to execution. His leading defence lawyer, Iqbal Raad, was gunned down in Karachi in mid-March. Nawaz's defence team blamed the military for providing inadequate protection. The military court proceedings were widely accused of being a show trial.

Nawaz was also tried for tax evasion on the purchase of a helicopter worth US$1 million. The Lahore High Court agreed to acquit him if he could prove his innocence, but Nawaz was unable to cite any substantial evidence. He was ordered to pay a fine of US$400,000 on grounds of tax evasion, and he was sentenced to 14 years of imprisonment.

Pakistan and Saudi Arabia, under Nawaz and King Fahd, had enjoyed extremely close business and cultural relations that is sometimes attributed as a special relationship. Saudi Arabia was shocked at the news of the coup. Amid pressure by Fahd and US President Bill Clinton, the military court avoided a death sentence for Sharif. Fahd had expressed concern that the death sentence would provoke intense ethnic violence in Pakistan as had happened in the 1980s following the execution of Zulfikar Ali Bhutto. Under an agreement facilitated by Saudi Arabia, Nawaz was placed in exile for the next 10 years, and agreed not to take part in politics in Pakistan for 21 years. He also forfeited property worth US$8.3 million (£5.7 million) and paid a fine of US$500,000. Musharraf wrote in his memoirs that, without the intervention of Fahd, Sharif would have been executed. Nawaz travelled to Jeddah, Saudi Arabia, where he was taken to a residence managed and controlled by the Saudi government, and provided a Saudi loan to establish a steel mill.

Return to Pakistan

Failed attempt in Islamabad
The Supreme Court of Pakistan ruled on 23 August 2007 that Nawaz and his brother, Shehbaz Sharif, were free to return to Pakistan. Both vowed to return soon. On 8 September, Lebanese politician Saad Hariri and Saudi intelligence chief Prince Muqrin bin Abdul-Aziz held an unprecedented joint press conference at Army Combatant Generals Headquarters (GHQ) to discuss how Nawaz's return would affect relations. Muqrin expressed hope that Nawaz would continue with the agreement to not return for 10 years, but said "these little things do not affect relations".

Two days later, Nawaz returned from exile in London to Islamabad. He was prevented from leaving the aeroplane and he was deported to Jeddah, Saudi Arabia, within hours. His political career appeared to be over.

Successful return in Lahore
Musharraf went to Saudi Arabia on 20 November 2007, the first time he left Pakistan since implementing the emergency rule. He attempted to convince Saudi Arabia to prevent Nawaz from returning until after the January 2008 elections. Nawaz had become more politically relevant after the return to Pakistan of Benazir Bhutto, who had also been exiled. Saudi Arabia suggested that if Pakistan had allowed a democratic-socialist woman leader, Bhutto, to return to the country, then the conservative Nawaz should be permitted to return as well.

Nawaz returned to Pakistan five days later. Thousands of supporters whistled and cheered as they hoisted Nawaz and his brother on their shoulders. After an 11-hour procession from the airport, he reached a mosque where he offered prayers as well as criticism against Musharraf. His return to Pakistan allowed only one day to register for elections, setting the stage for an overnight shift of the political scene.

2008 General elections

Nawaz called for the boycott of the January 2008 elections because he believed the poll would not be fair, given a state of emergency imposed by Musharraf. Nawaz and the PML-N decided to participate in the parliamentary elections after 33 opposition groups, including Bhutto's PPP, met in Lahore but failed to reach a joint position. He campaigned for the restoration of the independent judges removed by emergency government decree and Musharraf's departure.

Bhutto's assassination led to the postponement of the elections to 18 February 2008. Nawaz condemned Bhutto's assassination and called it the "gloomiest day in Pakistan's history". As the elections approached, the country faced a rise in attacks by militants. Nawaz accused Musharraf of ordering anti-terror operations that had left the country "drowned in blood". Pakistan's government urged opposition leaders to refrain from holding rallies ahead of the elections, citing an escalating terrorist threat. The PML-N rejected this, accusing officials of campaign interference.

On 25 January, Musharraf attempted British mediation to reconcile with the Nawaz brothers but failed. The elections were dominated by the PPP, boosted by the death of Bhutto, and PML-N. In the 342-seat National Assembly, PPP received 86 seats; the PML-N, 66; and the PML-Q, which backed Musharraf, 40.

In opposition (2008–2013)
Nawaz's party had joined a coalition with the PPP, led by its new leader Asif Ali Zardari, but the alliance was strained by differences. Nawaz won much public support for his uncompromising stand, and the coalition successfully forced Musharraf's resignation from the presidency. After the coalition's collapse, Nawaz pressured Zardari to reinstate the judges Musharraf removed during emergency rule. This led to the courts absolving Nawaz's criminal record so that he could re-enter parliament.

By-elections
In the June 2008 by-elections, Nawaz's party won 91 National Assembly seats and 180 provincial assembly seats in the Punjab. Election for the Lahore seat was postponed due to questions of Nawaz's eligibility to contest.

Musharraf impeachment
The coalition government agreed on 7 August 2008 to impeach Musharraf. Zardari and Nawaz sent a formal request for him to step down. A charge sheet had been drafted and was to be presented to parliament. It included Musharraf's first seizure of power in 1999 and his second in November 2007, when he declared an emergency as a means of being re-elected president. The charge-sheet also listed some of Musharraf's contributions to the "war on terror".

The National Assembly was summoned four days later to discuss impeachment proceedings. On 18 August, Musharraf resigned as President of Pakistan due to mounting political pressure. On 19 August, Musharraf defended his nine-year rule in an hour-long speech.

Nawaz claimed that Musharraf was responsible for the crisis in the nation. "Musharraf pushed the country's economy 20 years back after imposing martial law in the country and ousting the democratic government".

Lawyers movement

Musharraf had dismissed 60 judges and Chief Justice Iftikhar Chaudhry under the state of emergency in March 2007, in a failed bid to remain in power. Sharif had championed the cause of the judges since their dismissal, and he and Zardari had supported the reinstatement of judges in their campaigns. However, the new coalition government had failed to restore the judges, leading to its collapse in late 2008. Zardari feared that Chaudhry would undo all edicts instated by Musharraf including an amnesty that Zardari had received from corruption charges.

On 25 February 2009, the Supreme Court disqualified Nawaz Sharif and his brother Shehbaz Sharif, the Chief Minister of Punjab, from holding public office.
Zardari attempted to place Nawaz under house arrest, but the Punjab police left his residence after an angry crowd gathered outside. The police decision to lift his confinement was very likely in response to an army command. Nawaz, with a large contingent of SUVs, began leading a march to Islamabad but ended the march in Gujranwala. In a televised speech on 16 March, Prime Minister Yusuf Raza Gilani promised to reinstate Chaudhry after receiving pressure from Pakistan's army, American and British envoys, and internal protests. PPP made a secret agreement to restore the PML government in the Punjab. Nawaz then called off the "long march".

The PPP-led government continued to survive. A senior PML-N leader said "95% of the members of the PML(N) were against becoming part of the lawyers' movement, but after the [Supreme Court] verdict, the PML(N) had no other choice".

Removal of bar on third term
The 18th Amendment passed in Parliament on 8 April 2010, removing the bar which allowed prime ministers to serve a maximum of two terms in office. This made Nawaz eligible to again become prime minister, which he did in 2013.

2013 Pakistan general election

Khan–Sharif rivalry
Between 2011 and 2013, Nawaz and Imran Khan began to engage each other in a bitter feud. The rivalry between the two leaders grew in late 2011 when Khan addressed a large crowd at Minar-e-Pakistan in Lahore. The two began to blame each other for many political reasons.

From 26 April 2013, in the run up to the 2013 elections, both the PML-N and the Pakistan Tehreek-e-Insaf (PTI) vehemently criticised each other. Khan was accused of personally attacking Nawaz and was given notice by the Election Commission of Pakistan, though Khan denied it.

Policies

Nawaz campaigned on a promise to end loadshedding, construct motorways and Peshawar–Karachi high-speed rail. He also promised to construct a third port in Keti Bandar on the southern coast of Thatta District. Just prior to the election, Nawaz confirmed he had a long telephone conversation with Indian Prime Minister Manmohan Singh, suggesting a desire to improve diplomatic relations.

Results

The Election Commission of Pakistan announced that the PML-N had won 124 seats in Parliament. Needing 13 additional seats to form a majority, Sharif held talks with elected independent candidates to form a coalition. Eight days later, 18 independent candidates joined the party, allowing PML-N to form the government without the agreement of another political party. Nawaz stated that he wanted to take his oath as prime minister on 28 May, the fifteenth anniversary of the Chagai-I nuclear tests.

On 27 June 2014, Khan announced that PTI would march on 14 August in protest of the government, alleging that the 2013 elections had been rigged. On 6 August 2014, Khan demanded the assemblies be dissolved and the resignations of the election commission and prime minister, claiming that the march would be the "biggest political protest in the history of the country." PTI began their march from Lahore on 14 August and reached Islamabad on 16 August. Khan accused Nawaz of plundering the national wealth, and called on the public to withhold taxes and payment of utility bills to force the government to resign. In protest of alleged election rigging, the PTI's lawmakers announced their resignation from the National Assembly, and the Punjab and Sindh assemblies. PML-N attempted to negotiate a settlement with Khan and his party's backers to break the political deadlock. On 22 August 2014, Khan and his fellow 33 PTI lawmakers resigned from the National Assembly. He called for a caretaker government to be formed of non-politicians, and for fresh elections.

Third term as prime minister (2013–2017)

Nawaz was sworn in for an unprecedented third term as prime minister on 7 June 2013.
He faced numerous challenges, including bringing an end to US drone strikes and Taliban attacks while also tackling a crippled economy. Speculation was rife that the new government would need a bailout from the International Monetary Fund to restore economic stability.

Social policy

Nawaz's third term moved from social conservatism to social centrism. In 2016, he called the future of Pakistan as one underpinned as an "educated, progressive, forward looking and an enterprising nation". In January 2016 he backed the Punjab government policy of banning Tablighi Jamaat from preaching in educational institutions and in February he enacted a law to provide a helpline for women to report domestic abuse, despite the criticism of conservative religious parties.

Nawaz's government hanged Mumtaz Qadri on 29 February 2016. Qadri had fatally shot Salman Taseer over his opposition to blasphemy laws. According to BBC News, the move to hang Qadri was an indication of the government's growing confidence in taming the street power of religious groups. To the disliking of religious conservatives, Nawaz promised that the perpetrators of honour killings would be 'punished very severely'. In March 2016, The Washington Post reported that Nawaz was defying Pakistan's powerful clergy by unblocking access to YouTube, pushing to end child marriage, enacting a landmark domestic violence bill, and overseeing the execution of Qadri. Sunni Tehreek led protests of nearly 2,000 Islamic fundamentist on 28 March 2016, staging a three-day sit-in at the D-Chowk in Islamabad, demanding that Nawaz implement Shariah and declare Qadri a martyr. In response, Nawaz addressed the nation, stating that those "fanning the fire of hatred" would be dealt with under the law.

Nawaz's government declared that the Hindu festivals Diwali and Holi, and the Christian festival of Easter, were officially public holidays. Time Magazine called this a "significant step for the country's beleaguered religious minorities." On 6 December 2016, Nawaz approved the renaming of Quaid-i-Azam University's (QAU) physics centre to the Professor Abdus Salam Center for Physics. Nawaz also established the Professor Abdus Salam Fellowship to fully fund five Pakistani doctoral students in Physics. In response, the Council of Islamic Ideology criticised Nawaz's move claiming that "changing the department's name would not set the right precedent."

Nawaz stressed the need for operation Zarb-e-Qalam to fight societal extremism and intolerance through the power of "writers, poets and intellectuals". Addressing the Pakistan Academy of Literature, Nawaz said that "in a society where flowers of poetry and literature bloom, the diseases of extremism, intolerance, disunity and sectarianism are not born". Nawaz also announced a  million endowment fund for the promotion of art and literary activities in Pakistan. On 9 January 2017, the government denied visas for international preachers for the Tablighi Jamaat conference in Lahore. Jamia Binoria criticised the government's decisions.

Nawaz, in a March 2017 address at Jamia Naeemia, urged Islamic scholars to spread the true teachings of Islam and take a firm stand against those who are causing disunity among Muslims. Nawaz called for a "progressive and prosperous Muslim world", and asked the "religious scholars to [...] take the war against these terrorists to its logical end."

Economic policy

The country's economy faced many challenges including energy shortages, hyperinflation, mild economic growth, high debt and a large budget deficit. Shortly after taking power in 2013, Nawaz received a US$6.6 billion loan from the International Monetary Fund (IMF) to avoid a balance-of-payments crisis. Lower oil prices, higher remittances and increased consumer spending pushed growth toward a seven-year high of 4.3 percent in 2014–15.

Asian Development Bank attributed gradual growth in economy to the continued low prices for oil and other commodities, the expected pick-up in growth in the advanced economies, and some alleviation of power shortages. However, the sovereign debt of Pakistan increased dramatically, with total debts and liabilities swelled to  trillion (or US$73 billion) by August 2016. Nawaz's administration issued a five-year $500-million Eurobond in 2015 at 8.25% interest and in September 2016, it also raised $1 billion by floating Sukuk (Islamic bonds) at 5.5%.

The Sharif administration negotiated free trade agreements (FTAs) to expand trade liberalisation, notably with Turkey, South Korea, Iran, and Thailand, and an expansion of the FTA with Malaysia.

According to the Pakistan Institute of Legislative Development and Transparency (PILDAT), the quality of governance had 'marginally improved' during Nawaz's first year in power within an overall score of 44%. It scored highest in disaster-preparedness, merit-based recruitment, and foreign policy management, while it received the lowest scores on poverty alleviation and transparency.

On 4 July 2013, the IMF and Pakistan reached a provisional agreement on a US$5.3 billion bailout package to bolster Pakistan's flagging economy and its perilously low foreign exchange reserves, which was contrary to an election promise not to take any more loans. On 4 September, IMF approved another $6.7 billion loan package over a three-year period. IMF demanded Pakistan conduct economic reforms, including privatising 31 state-owned companies.

Business confidence in Pakistan reached a three-year high in May 2014 backed by increasing foreign reserves which crossed US$15 billion by mid-2014. In May 2014, IMF stated that inflation had dropped to 13% (compared to 25% in 2008), foreign reserves were in a better position and that the current account deficit had come down to 3% of GDP. Standard & Poor's and Moody's Corporation changed Pakistan's long-term rating to 'stable outlook'. The World Bank stated on 9 April 2014 that Pakistan's economy was at a turning point, with projected GDP growth approaching 4%, driven by manufacturing and service sectors, better energy availability, and early revival of investor confidence.

In FY2015, industrial growth slowed due to power shortages, as Sharif's administration failed to make adequate reforms in energy, taxation, and public sector enterprises. On 3 May, The Economist gave Sharif's administration partial credit for the economy's new stability, having upheld its agreements with the IMF. Standard & Poor revised Pakistan's credit rating from 'stable' to 'positive', noting the government's efforts towards fiscal consolidation, improvement in external financing conditions, and stronger capital inflows.

During a trip to Pakistan on 10 February 2016, World Bank Group's president Jim Yong Kim applauded the economic policies of Nawaz's government. He claimed that Pakistan's economic outlook had become more stable. On 19 March, Nawaz approved tax incentives in an attempt to attract new automotive manufacturing plants to the country. In November 2016, the government announced that Renault was expected to start assembling cars in Pakistan by 2018.

On 8 April 2016, following lobbying by international development groups, the government changed its methodology for measuring poverty. A PILDAT survey claimed that the quality of governance had improved, though it was still weak for transparency. Fred Hochberg, head of the Export–Import Bank of the United States visited Pakistan on 14 April and said that he "sees a lot of opportunities to expand its exposure to Pakistan."

On 9 May, the World Bank's Pakistan Development Report stated that the current account was in a healthy position, but that Pakistan's export competitiveness has diminished due to protectionist policies, poor infrastructure, and high transaction costs for trade. Consequently, Pakistan's exports-to-GDP ratio had been declining for the last two decades.

On 15 December 2016, Pakistan became a signatory of the Organisation for Economic Co-operation and Development's (OECD) Convention on Mutual Administrative Assistance in Tax Matters, aimed at curbing tax evasion. In his 2016 book, The Rise and Fall of Nations, Ruchir Sharma stated that Pakistan's economy was at a 'take-off' stage and the future outlook to 2020 was 'very good'.

On 24 October 2016, months after the Sharif government concluded a US$6.4 billion three-year programmes, IMF managing director Christine Lagarde visited Pakistan, during which she maintained Pakistan was "out of the economic crisis". She added that continued efforts were needed to bring more people under taxation and to ensure that all paid their fair share. The 2017 Ease of doing business index recognised Pakistan as one of the ten countries making the biggest improvements to business regulations.

Hundreds of Chinese trucks loaded with goods rolled into the Sost dry port in Gilgit-Baltistan on 1 November as the first shipment of the China–Pakistan Economic Corridor.

The government announced plans to restructure PIA, which sought to become more competitive by leasing newer and more efficient aircraft. PIA was split into two companies: a holding group would retain some  billion in debt and excess personnel, and a "new" PIA would hold the lucrative landing rights and new aircraft. The government planned to sell a 26% stake in the new PIA to a strategic partner. In February 2016, Pakistan International Airlines Corporation (PIAC) is to be converted into a public limited company as Pakistan International Airlines Company Limited (PIACL) to make way for privatisation, however, this trigged an eight-day union strike. On 23 December 2016, a Chinese consortium won the bid for a 40% stake in the PSX with an offer of US$85.5 million.

Communications and development

Upon assuming office, Nawaz launched the Public Sector Development Programme (PSDP) which constructed major projects to stimulate the economy. This included Diamer-Bhasha Dam, Dasu Dam, Faisalabad-Khanewal M-4 Motorway, Rawalpindi-Islamabad Metrobus Service and Lahore-Karachi Motorway. Nawaz also approved feasibility studies for numerous other projects. The government allocated  billion of PSDP funds for the China-Pakistan Economic Corridor, including the Lahore-Karachi Motorway.

On 24 April 2014, mobile companies Mobilink, Telenor, Ufone and Zong won auctions for 3G and 4G mobile spectrum licenses, raising US$1.112 billion. Nawaz stated that  billion will be collected in annual revenue from the licenses, while the technology would create millions of jobs in the service sector. Nawaz also launched the Prime Minister's Youth Programme, providing a  billion fund for interest-free loans, skills development and provision of laptop computers.

Pakistan Vision 2025
In August 2014, the Sharif administration unveiled an ambitious programme to enhance exports to US$150 billion by 2025.  According to the Daily Times, the Vision 2025 is based on seven pillars: putting people first; developing human and social capital; achieving sustained, indigenous and inclusive growth; governance, institutional reform and modernisation of the public sector; energy, water and food security; private-sector-led growth and entrepreneurship, developing a competitive knowledge economy through value addition and modernisation of transportation infrastructure and greater regional connectivity.

Nuclear power policy

In November 2013, Nawaz broke ground on a US$9.59 billion nuclear power complex in Karachi, designed to produce 2200 MW of electricity. During the groundbreaking ceremony, Nawaz stated that Pakistan would construct six nuclear power plants during his term in office. He went on to say that Pakistan has plans to construct a total of 32 nuclear power plants by 2050, which will generate more than 40,000 MW. In February 2014, Nawaz confirmed to the IAEA that all future civilian nuclear power plants and research reactors will voluntarily be put under IAEA safeguards.

Nawaz attended the 2014 Nuclear Security Summit, and stated that Pakistan was giving nuclear security the highest importance.

FATA reform
On 3 March 2017, Nawaz's cabinet approved a set of steps to be taken for the proposed merger of the Federally Administered Tribal Areas (FATA) with Khyber Pakhtunkhwa, along with a 10-year  billion development-reform package. Under the reform project, the jurisdiction of the Supreme Court and the Peshawar High Court will be extended to the FATA region.

National security and defence policy

On 9 September 2013, Nawaz proposed a civil-military partnership, and immediately reestablished the National Security Council with Sartaj Aziz as his National Security Advisor (NSA). Nawaz also reconstituted the Cabinet Committee on National Security (C2NS), with military representation in the political body. According to political scientist and civic-military relations expert Aqil Shah, Nawaz finally did exactly what former chairman joint chiefs Jehangir Karamat had called for in 1998.

In September 2013, Nawaz announced that Pakistan would open unconditional talks with the Taliban, declaring them stakeholders rather than terrorists. The PML-N's conservative hardliners also chose to blame the US and NATO for causing terrorism in Pakistan. However, Pakistani Taliban's Supreme Council demanded a cease-fire, to also include the release of all imprisoned militants and the withdrawal of the Pakistani military from all tribal regions. Former and current government officials criticised Nawaz for not providing clear leadership on how to handle the more than 40 militant groups, many of them comprising violent Islamic extremists.

On 15 September, just six days after Nawaz's proposal for talks with the Taliban, a roadside bomb killed Major-General Sanaullah Khan, a lieutenant colonel and another soldier in the Upper Dir district near the Afghanistan border. Taliban spokesman Shahidullah Shahid claimed responsibility for the bombing. On the same day, seven more soldiers were killed in four separate attacks. In a press release, Chairman joint chiefs General Khalid Shameem Wynne and chief of army staff General Ashfaq Parvez Kayani, who had earlier warned Nawaz not to adopt a surrender strategy, publicly warned the government that the military would not allow the Taliban to set conditions for peace. General Kayani stated: "No-one should have any misgivings that we would let terrorists coerce us into accepting their terms."

Seven members of the Tehrik-i-Taliban Pakistan conducted a terrorist attack on a public school in the city of Peshawar on 16 December, killing over 130 children in Pakistan's deadliest terrorist attack. In response to the attack, Nawaz – with consultation from all political parties – devised a 20-point National Action Plan which included continued execution of convicted terrorists, establishment of special military courts for two years and regulation of madrasas.

Based on the National Action Plan, the government made 32,347 arrests in 28,826 operations conducted across the country from 24 December 2014 to 25 March 2015. During the same period, Pakistan deported 18,855 Afghan refugees while the Federal Investigation Agency (FIA) registered 64 cases for money transfer through Hawala, arrested 83 people and recovered  million. In total, 351 actionable calls were received on the anti-terror helpline and National Database and Registration Authority verified 59.47 million . On 28 March 2016, a suicide attack by the Jamaat-ul-Ahrar at a park in Lahore killed 70 people on the evening of Easter Sunday. Analysts believed that Nawaz's desire to maintain stability in Punjab led him to turn a blind eye towards groups operating there. Following the attack, Pakistan detained more than 5,000 suspects and made 216 arrests.

Karachi operation
The Sharif government launched a ranger-led operation on 5 September 2013 in Karachi, aimed at removing crime and terrorism from the metropolis. During the first phase, which lasted until 10 August 2015, rangers reported to have conducted 5,795 raids during which they had apprehended 10,353 suspects and recovered 7,312 weapons. Prominent among the raids were the 11 March raid on the Muttahida Qaumi Movement (MQM) headquarters Nine Zero and the offices of Sindh Building Control Authority (SBCA). The first phase also saw a total of 826 terrorists, 334 target killers, and 296 extortionists arrested. The Rangers expanded their mandate to kidnappers, and arrested 82 abductors and secured the release of 49 captives. The report stated that targeted killing in the city had dropped by over 80%. On 23 August 2016, officials claimed that they had arrested 654 target killers affiliated with the Muttahida Qaumi Movement's (MQM) armed wing since 4 September 2013.

Operation Zarb-e-Azb

Negotiations with the Taliban collapsed after the execution of 23 Frontier Corps by the Taliban on 17 February 2014, and relations worsened with the Taliban's 2014 Jinnah International Airport attack. Operation Zarb-e-Azb was formally launched on 15 June 2014 after the Sharif administration prepared for a three-front offensive: isolating targeted militant groups, obtaining support from the political parties, and protecting civilians from reprisals. The 2014 Wagah border suicide attack has been the deadliest retaliation against the operation so far.

Foreign policy

Neighbouring countries
Nawaz launched 'peaceful neighbourhood' initiative to improve Pakistan's ties with India, Afghanistan, Iran and China. On 12 May 2014, Nawaz met Iranian President Hassan Rouhani amid tensions over the February kidnapping of five Iranian soldiers by extremists who took them into Pakistan.

On 27 October 2016, Nawaz hosted the 15th ministerial meeting of Central Asia Regional Economic Cooperation Program (CAREC), and proposed an Open Skies Agreement between the countries.

China

Chinese Premier Li Keqiang was the first world leader to visit Pakistan and congratulate Nawaz on his 2013 electoral victory. Upon return to Beijing, Li announced investment of US$31.5 billion in Pakistan, mainly in energy, infrastructure and a port expansion for Gwadar, the terminus of the China–Pakistan Economic Corridor. According to The Express Tribune, Sharif's government had charged the army with providing fool-proof security to Chinese officials in Balochistan to address Beijing's concerns regarding investment in the province, which was to receive 38% of the funds.

On 8 November 2014, Nawaz led a delegation to Beijing and signed agreements for Chinese investment reportedly worth about $46 billion. Nawaz also announced Pakistan would aid China it its fight against the East Turkestan Islamic Movement. On 24 June 2015 and again on 1 April 2016 China blocked India's move in the UN to ban Jaish-e-Mohammed chief Masood Azhar; the Chinese action was in "consultation" with Pakistan. On 25 June 2016, Pakistan became a full member of Shanghai Cooperation Organisation. On 4 September 2016, Pakistan's cabinet was given approval to negotiate a long-term defence agreement with China.

India

Nawaz launched talks with India to liberalize their trade relationship, and gained and an agreement of Non-Discriminatory Market Access on Reciprocal Basis (NDMARB) status for the two countries on 26 March 2014. However, The Times of India reported that Pakistan's military pressured Nawaz to stop trade liberalisation with India. Nawaz attended the 26 May 2014 inauguration of Narendra Modi as prime minister, the first time that a prime minister from one state attended the inauguration of their counterpart. They agreed to further cooperate on trade.

In October 2014, 20 civilians were killed and thousands forced to flee their homes when Pakistani and Indian security forces began shelling in Kashmir, each side blaming the other for the incident. The following month, Nawaz blamed India for an inflexible approach towards resolving the Kashmir dispute. According to Barkha Dutt during the 2015 SAARC Summit, Nawaz and Modi held a secret meeting.

On 10 December 2015, during the Heart of Asia conference, Pakistan and India announced that they were resuming dialogue on outstanding issues, ending a two-year stalemate. On 1 April 2015, Modi made his first visit to Pakistan in a surprise stopover in Lahore to meet Nawaz on his birthday. Modi and Nawaz held a brief meeting at Raiwind Palace. Modi also attended the wedding ceremony of Nawaz's granddaughter.

Balochistan's Home Minister Sarfraz Bugti announced on 25 March 2016 that they had arrested an Indian naval intelligence officer working for Research and Analysis Wing (RAW). Kulbushan Yadav was allegedly involved in financially supporting terrorists and also confessed to his involvement in unrest in Karachi. The same day, India's Ministry of External Affairs stated that Yadav had had no involvement with the government since his early retirement from the Indian Navy. India also demanded consular access for him. On 29 March 2016, Sharif's government released a six-minute video of Jadhav apparently confessing to the RAW's involvement in the country. On 1 April, Pakistan confirmed that security agencies had arrested several suspects believed to be working for RAW.

Relations between India and Pakistan escalated with the killing of Burhan Wani by Indian security forces on 8 July 2016. Anti-Indian protests started in all 10 districts of the Kashmir Valley. Protesters defied curfew with attacks on security forces and public properties.[20][21] The unrest led to a standstill in bilateral relations. Indian Home Minister Rajnath Singh accused Pakistan of backing unrest in Kashmir. Tensions reached a boiling point when militants attacked an army base in the Indian-controlled side of Kashmir and killed 18 soldiers. Indian army military operations head Lieutenant-General Ranbir Singh claimed that there was evidence the attackers were members of an Islamist militant group in Pakistan.

Addressing the UN General Assembly on 22 September 2016, Nawaz demanded an independent inquiry and a UN fact-finding mission to investigate extrajudicial killing and human rights abuses in Jammu and Kashmir. India's junior foreign minister M. J. Akbar criticised Nawaz for glorifying Wani. Tensions further escalated with reports suggesting moblisation of military equipment by both sides.

Afghanistan
Nawaz greeted Afghan President Ashraf Ghani on 15 November 2014 and pledged his support to the Afghan president over his attempt to bring the Taliban to the negotiating table. Al Jazeera reported that "the leaders also pledged to begin a new era of economic co-operation, with Ghani saying three days of talks had ended 13 years of testy relations". The two countries also signed a trade deal aimed at doubling trade between the Kabul and Islamabad to US$5 billion by 2017, while also pledging to work together on a power import project and Trans-Afghanistan Pipeline. During the visit Nawaz and Ghani also watched a cricket match between the two countries. During June 2016, cross-border shootings between Afghan and Pakistani forces left three people dead after tensions escalated over Pakistan's construction of fences across the Durand Line. On 20 June, Pakistan completed the construction of a  trench along the border in Balochistan.

United States

Nawaz paid an official visit to Washington, D.C. from 20 to 23 October 2013. He and Barack Obama committed to strengthening relations and advancing shared interests for a prosperous Pakistan. Voice of America reported that the US released more than US$1.6 billion in military and economic aid that was suspended when relations suffered over the covert raid that killed Osama bin Laden in 2011.

On Pakistan's request the United States temporarily stopped drone strikes in north-western Pakistan. In March 2016, as one of his foreign policy successes, the United States Senate blocked a bid to derail the sale of F-16 Falcons to Pakistan by Senate Foreign Relations Committee Chairman Bob Corker, who continued to vow to block the use of US funds to finance the deal.

US Senator John McCain travelled to Pakistan on 26 July 2016 to discuss counterterrorism efforts in the region. In the Financial Times, McCain called upon the US and Pakistani leaders not to "allow ambivalence and suspicion to fester", adding that "common interests in counterterrorism, nuclear security and regional stability are too important and too urgent". He also called upon the Obama administration to "make clear its enduring commitment to Pakistan's stability and economic growth." McCain also visited Miramshah in North Waziristan.

Republican Congressmen Ted Poe and Dana Rohrabacher moved a bill in the US Congress on 21 September to designate Pakistan as a state sponsor of terrorism. McCain assured former Pakistani President Asif Ali Zardari that the bill would not pass, and that its sponsors represented a small minority.

Nawaz called president-elect Donald Trump on 1 December 2016 to congratulate him. The statement released by Nawaz's office quoted Trump calling Nawaz a "terrific guy", adding that Pakistan is a "fantastic country, fantastic place". Trump Tower put out a statement saying that they "had a productive conversation about how the United States and Pakistan will have a strong working relationship in the future." On 3 December, Dawn reported that a US National Defence Authorisation Act was set to be approved by the US Congress which would recognise Pakistan as a key strategic partner and pledge more than US$900 million in economic and other assistance to the country; half of that would be dependent on Pakistan's commitment to fighting all terrorist groups, including the Haqqani network.

Europe

Nawaz visited London on 30 April 2014 and met David Cameron and other officials, and delivered a keynote address at the Pakistan Investment Conference. According to Cameron's staff, the leaders agreed to work together to support critical economic reforms for Pakistan, particularly to increase the tax-to-GDP ratio towards 15%, and welcomed the developing relationship between the Federal Board of Revenue and HM Revenue and Customs to support this. On 11 November 2014, Nawaz visited Berlin where he met with German Chancellor Angela Merkel. According to Deutsche Welle, during the meeting Nawaz argued for more German investment, particularly in the energy sector, but Merkel expressed wariness over the security situation in Pakistan.

In 2014, during the visit of Russian Defence Minister Sergey Shoygu, Pakistan and Russia signed an agreement on military cooperation. Shoygu held in-depth talks with Nawaz, who promised to promote multi-dimensional relations with Russia. The meeting came months after Russia had lifted an embargo on supplying weapons and military hardware to Pakistan, starting with Mil Mi-24 helicopters. As a sign of improving ties, Russian forces arrived in Pakistan on 23 September 2016 to participate in joint military exercises.

Muslim world

Nawaz is said to enjoy exceptionally close ties with senior members of the Saudi royal family. Pakistan Today reported on 2 April 2014 that Pakistan will sell JF-17 Thunder jets to Saudi Arabia, after the kingdom had given a grant of US$1.5 billion to Pakistan in early 2014.
Saudi Arabia's Crown Prince Salman bin Abdulaziz al-Saud arrived in Pakistan on 15 February to meet Nawaz and vowed to enhance work between the two countries. Sharif travelled to Saudi Arabia for the last 10 days of Ramadan. King Abdullah said on 26 July that Saudi Arabia would always stand by Pakistan, its leadership and people, after an hour-long meeting with Nawaz at his Riyadh. Nawaz also met Muqrin bin Abdulaziz Al Saud, while Salman bin Abdulaziz Al Saud referred to Pakistan as his second home.

Al-Monitor reported on 15 March 2015 that the Salman of Saudi Arabia wanted firm assurances from Nawaz that Pakistan would align itself with Saudi Arabia and its Sunni Arab allies against Iran, especially in the proxy war underway in Yemen. Salman specifically wanted a Pakistani military contingent to deploy to the kingdom to defend the borders. Nawaz promised closer counter-terrorism and military co-operation but no troops for the immediate future. On 11 January 2016, Time stated that a high-level Iranian delegation including Adel al-Jubeir and Mohammad bin Salman Al Saud had travelled to Islamabad to seek Pakistan's inclusion in the 34-country "Islamic military alliance". However, Nawaz struck a more conciliatory tone, suggesting that Islamabad would mediate between Saudi Arabia and Iran. On 19 January 2016, Nawaz and Chief of Army Staff Raheel Sharif embarked on a peace mission to Riyadh and Tehran to reduce tensions which had escalated with the execution of Sheikh Nimr. On 16 March 2016, Zee News claimed that Saudi Arabia was creating a military alliance of Islamic countries along the lines of the NATO, and wished Pakistan to lead it.

Nawaz supported the Saudi-led intervention in Bahrain and in his visit to Saudi Arabia he reassured that he would "help devise a new battle plan for Saudi intervention in the country."

Personal life
Nawaz married Kulsoom Nawaz, who was also of Kashmiri descent, in April 1971. His brother Shehbaz Sharif served as Chief Minister of Punjab province four times and is currently the prime minister of Pakistan, while his nephew Hamza Shahbaz Sharif is currently Leader of the Opposition in the Provincial Assembly of the Punjab. Nawaz's daughter Maryam Nawaz is the current Central Vice President of PML-N. Maryam is married to politician Muhammad Safdar Awan. His other daughter, Asma Nawaz, is married to Ali Dar, son of Ishaq Dar, the former finance minister of Pakistan.

The personal residence of the Sharif family, Raiwind Palace, is located in Jati Umra, Raiwind, on the outskirts of Lahore. He also has a residence in Jeddah, Saudi Arabia, known as the Sharif Villa, where he lived during his years in exile. His elder son, Hussain Nawaz, is a businessman based in Saudi Arabia and currently resides in Jeddah. His younger son, Hassan Nawaz, is also a businessman and lives in London.

Nawaz underwent open heart surgery in May 2016 in London. It was his second open-heart operation. His deteriorating health forced him to undergo an open heart surgery only three days before the presentation of the country's annual budget. Many opposition leaders and the legal fraternity, including former Chief Justice Iftikhar Muhammad Chaudhry, raised questions about a possible constitutional crisis in Pakistan. Chaudhry called for electing a new interim prime minister to avoid the crisis.

Public image
Jon Boone wrote in The Guardian in 2013, that following his attempts to enact Sharia Law in the late 1990s, Nawaz had adopted a more centrist position by seeking diplomatic and trade relations with India which encouraged support from left-leaning Pakistanis. In another column, The Guardian described Nawaz's first two terms in the 1990s as authoritarian and clouded by allegations of corruption, but that "old foes and longstanding friends say Nawaz is a changed man" from when he originally entered politics "to defend family [business] interests".

Tim Craig, writing in March 2016 for The Washington Post, described Nawaz's move away from social conservatism as "traced to Sharif's ambitious economic agenda, the influence his 42-year-old daughter has over him, and his awareness that Pakistan remains the butt of jokes". Afrasiab Khattak summarized the shift by stating "[Nawaz] knows extremism is not good for business". Nawaz's advisor Miftah Ismail described him as "a very religious guy", adding however "he is perfectly okay with other people not being religious". Writing for The Express Tribune in 2016, Fahd Hussain stated that Nawaz will likely will face "blowback from its natural allies among the clergy", adding that with "the bulk of the Punjab conservative voter[s] [remaining] in the Nawaz camp", that Nawazis eyeing the "liberal, progressive, left-of-centre voters".

Leftist Senator Raza Rabbani claimed that Nawaz "has always had these rightwing leanings", adding that "the temptation was there in the past to appease his rightwing Islamist constituency". Mushahid Hussain Syed, a former member of Nawaz's cabinet, described Nawaz's religious leanings: "he is quite a good Muslim in terms of belief and basic rituals like prayer and going to Mecca" adding however, "in cultural terms he is quite relaxed. He likes music and movies and has a good sense of humour. He is not your average type of serious, sulking fundo." Mohammed Hanif, writing in 2013, claimed that "if Nawaz weren't from the dominant province Punjab, where most of the army elite comes from, if he didn't represent the trading and business classes of Punjab, he would still be begging forgiveness for his sins in Saudi".

Author Edward A. Gargan, writing in November 1991, described Nawaz's government as "bedeviled by gossip, barraged by accusations of venality, castigated by the opposition and threatened by a final rupture of cordiality with the United States". The same year Najam Sethi described Nawaz's government as "corrupt, absolutely, astronomically corrupt, including the prime minister". In 2009, The New York Times wrote that "Bhutto and her Pakistan Peoples Party were considered more amenable allies for Washington" adding that "more nationalistic and religiously oriented, [Nawaz] and his party, the Pakistan Muslim League-N, have traditionally found common cause with the religious parties". Pervez Hoodbhoy described Nawaz as "a reflection of Pakistani society" adding that "he is silent on what matters most: the insurgency. What we need is a leader." Celia W. Dugger, writing in 1999, described Sharif's Raiwind Palace as "walls paneled in silken fabrics and rococo chairs laden with so much gold leaf they looked like they belonged in the court of Louis XIV or a bordello", drawing comparison between Nawaz's lifestyle and that of the "Mughals".

Criticism

After his return to power in 2013, a protest movement led by Imran Khan, Tahir-ul-Qadri and supported by rival factions of the Muslim League, such as the Pakistan Muslim League-Q (PLM-Q) and Awami Muslim League (AML), mounted pressure on the Sharif government. Khan demanded Nawaz's resignation over allegations that the 2013 general election was rigged. Nawaz claimed to have support from the majority of the parties in Parliament. PML-N claimed that the elections had been the most free and fair in the country's history. Nawaz was also criticised by his opponents for running a system of patronage in which relatives were appointed to key state positions such as his brother as Chief Minister, and other relatives as cabinet ministers.

The Express Tribune claimed on 20 April 2015 that Sharif's administration misled the International Monetary Fund (IMF) over the tax charged on the issuance of bonus shares, as what should have been the largest source of income tax stood at a mere  billion.

Human rights activist Sabeen Mahmud was shot dead on 24 April 2015 in Karachi minutes after she attended a talk she had organised on Human rights violations in Balochistan. Activists and investigators alleged that she was killed for her activism and for being outspoken on various contentious topics, from extremism to state-sponsored abuses. The talk that Mahmud organised that night was to have been held at the Lahore University of Management Sciences, but the university cancelled it the day before under alleged pressure from government authorities. Nawaz officially condemned the killing but Dawn noted that there was a little chance her murderers would be brought to justice given the recent history of impunity among those who target the country's marginalised liberals.

Around 2,000 far-right protesters led by Sunni Tehreek staged a sit-in at D-Chowk in front of the parliament in Islamabad on 27 March 2016, causing a partial shutdown of the capital. The protestors demanded the implementation of Sharia in the country and declaring Mumtaz Qadri a martyr. The protestors burned cars and a public transit station and injured journalists and bystanders. The government called in the army to enforce order. By 29 March the crowd had shrunk to 700 protestors, and the protest ended on 30 March after the government promised not to amend the blasphemy laws.

On 7 April 2016, The Express Tribune claimed that Nawaz's multibillion-rupee health insurance plan seemed to be failing because of poor planning, claiming that the basic health infrastructure doesn't allow for such a plan.

Imran Khan began mobilising workers on 29 October 2016 to lockdown Islamabad, demanding Nawaz's resignation and a corruption inquiry. In response, the Sharif government placed a citywide ban on gatherings and arrested hundreds of opposition activists. The government also arrested scores of Pakistan Tehreek-e-Insaf workers and closed the motorway leading from Khyber Pakhtunkhwa. On 1 November, Khan ceased protests after the Supreme Court said it would form a judicial commission to probe allegations stemming from the "Panama Papers" leaks about the Sharif family's offshore wealth. In the first week of January, four Pakistani activists known on social media for their secular leftist views went missing.

The Economist, writing in January 2017, criticised Nawaz's spending on infrastructure, explaining that it sat unused as "the economic boom it was meant to trigger has never arrived." Regarding the China–Pakistan Economic Corridor, the magazine wrote that "critics fear the country will struggle to pay back the debt, especially if foreign-exchange earnings from exports continue to dwindle" further adding that "It may not concern Mr. Sharif unduly if the next generation of roads is as deserted as the last."

Wealth and conglomerates
The growth of Pakistan's industry, which occurred under President Ayub Khan during the 1960s, was destroyed by the nationalisation program instituted by Prime Minister Zulfiqar Ali Bhutto, to halt capital flight from the country to Eastern Europe. This program included nationalisation of Ittefaq Group and many other large enterprises.

Although the steel mill was returned to the Sharif family in 1980, havoc had already wrought. In 2011, Nawaz's assets were worth Rs 166 million, which increased to Rs 1.82 billion by 2013. In 2012 his net income was Rs. 12.4 million ($1.24 million). He was one of five billionaires elected to Pakistan's National Assembly in 2013. In 2015, his declared assets slightly decreased to  billion ($17.5 Million). As of 2017 his net worth is over  billion.

2016 Panama Papers leak

According to the Panama Papers, documents leaked in 2016 from law firm Mossack Fonseca, Nawaz's family holds millions of dollars worth of property and companies in the UK and around the world. Although they do not name Nawaz Sharif or his younger brother Shehbaz Sharif, they link in-laws of Shehbaz Sharif and children of Nawaz Sharif to numerous offshore companies.

On 15 April 2016, the government announced an investigation by an inquiry commission of all Pakistanis named in the documents. Opposition politicians said a judge, not a retired judge, should investigate. Various judges recused themselves. In addition, on 19 April, army chief General Raheel Sharif warned that across-the-board accountability was needed.

The court announced its decision on 28 July 2017 and disqualified Nawaz from holding public office, stating that he had been dishonest in not disclosing his employment in the Dubai-based Capital FZE company in his nomination papers. The court also ordered National Accountability Bureau to file a reference against Nawaz and his family on corruption charges.

In 2018, the Pakistani Supreme Court ruled in Sami Ullah Baloch v. Abdul Karim Nousherwani that Nawaz would be disqualified from holding public office for life due to his involvement in the Panama Papers case of 2017. On 6 July 2018, the Federal Judicial Complex of Pakistan sentenced Nawaz to ten years in prison. Nawaz's daughter Maryam Nawaz and her husband Safdar Awan were given prison sentences of seven years and one year, respectively. The two were subsequently arrested on their arrival in Lahore on 13 July and imprisoned in the Adiala Jail. Nawaz and Maryam were also fined £2 million and £8 million, respectively.

Reports claimed that Nawaz suffered four angina attacks and his family complained that the Imran Khan government was not allowing him time for medical treatment. The Islamabad High Court (IHC) granted him bail on humanitarian grounds in October 2019, and Nawaz went to London for medical treatment. Later in March, he was granted bail for a period of six weeks by the Supreme Court to continue pursuing his health treatment. After failing to return to Pakistan when his bail expired, the IHC declared him an absconder. He currently faces non-bailable arrest warrants for the Al-Azizia corruption case.

Eponymous entities
 Muhammad Nawaz Sharif University of Agriculture
 Muhammad Nawaz Sharif University of Engineering & Technology
 Nawaz Sharif Medical College

See also
List of international prime ministerial trips made by Nawaz Sharif

References

Further reading

External links

 
 

|-

|-

|-

|-

|-

|-

|-

|-

|-

|-

|-

 
Articles containing video clips
1949 births
Living people
Businesspeople from Lahore
Chief Ministers of Punjab, Pakistan
Defence Ministers of Pakistan
Expelled members of the National Assembly of Pakistan
Foreign Ministers of Pakistan
Government College University, Lahore alumni
Honorary Knights Grand Cross of the Order of St Michael and St George
Leaders of the Opposition (Pakistan)
Leaders ousted by a coup
Overturned convictions in Pakistan
Pakistan Railways cricketers
Pakistani anti-communists
Pakistani cricketers
Pakistani democracy activists
Pakistani exiles
Pakistani expatriates in Saudi Arabia
Pakistani expatriates in the United Kingdom
Pakistani industrialists
Pakistani lawyers
Pakistani MNAs 1990–1993
Pakistani MNAs 1993–1996
Pakistani MNAs 1997–1999
Pakistani MNAs 2013–2018
Pakistani people of Kashmiri descent
Pakistani political party founders
Pakistani politicians convicted of corruption
Pakistani prisoners and detainees
Pakistani Sunni Muslims
Pakistani venture capitalists
People from Jeddah
People from Raiwind
Politicians from Lahore
Presidents of the Pakistan Muslim League (N)
Prime Ministers of Pakistan
Punjab MPAs 1985–1988
Punjab MPAs 1988–1990
Punjab University Law College alumni
Punjabi people
St. Anthony's High School, Lahore alumni
Nawaz
Pakistan Muslim League (N) MNAs
Pakistan Muslim League (N) MPAs (Punjab)
Finance Ministers of Punjab, Pakistan
Heads of government who were later imprisoned